The canton of Bâgé-le-Châtel  is a former administrative division in eastern France. It was disbanded following the French canton reorganisation which came into effect in March 2015. It had 16,187 inhabitants (2012).

The canton comprised 10 communes:

Asnières-sur-Saône
Bâgé-la-Ville
Bâgé-le-Châtel
Dommartin
Feillens
Manziat
Replonges
Saint-André-de-Bâgé
Saint-Laurent-sur-Saône
Vésines

Demographics

See also
Cantons of the Ain department 
Communes of France

References

Former cantons of Ain
2015 disestablishments in France
States and territories disestablished in 2015